Saram or Sarem may refer to:
 Sarem, Gilan (سارم - Sārem)
 Saram, Mazandaran (سارم - Sāram)
 Saram, Qom (صرم - Şaram)

Saram may also refer to:
 Saram, Boaro, a census town in Jharkhand, India